Canariellidae is a taxonomic family of small to medium-sized air-breathing land snails, terrestrial pulmonate gastropod mollusks in the superfamily Helicoidea.

Anatomy 
The family is characterized by having a short flagellum and a stimulatory apparatus composed only of one to three single mucous glands (lacking dart or accessory sacs).

Taxonomy 
The family Canariellidae consists of:
 Canariella P. Hesse, 1918
 Debeauxhelix Bacci, 1943
 Montserratina Ortiz de Zarate Lopez, 1946
 Schileykiella Manganelli, Sparacio & Giusti, 1989
 Tyrrheniellina Giusti & Manganelli, 1992

References 

 Bouchet P., Rocroi J.P., Hausdorf B., Kaim A., Kano Y., Nützel A., Parkhaev P., Schrödl M. & Strong E.E. (2017). Revised classification, nomenclator and typification of gastropod and monoplacophoran families. Malacologia. 61(1-2): 1-526

External links
 Razkin, O., Gómez-Moliner, B. J., Prieto, C. E., Martínez-Ortí, A., Arrébola, J. R., Muñoz, B., Chueca, L. J. & Madeira, M. J. (2015). Molecular phylogeny of the western Palaearctic Helicoidea (Gastropoda, Stylommatophora). Molecular Phylogenetics and Evolution. 83: 99-117.

Stylommatophora